Blood-Club Dolls 2 is a 2020 Japanese action horror film based on the 2011 anime television series Blood-C co-created by studio Production I.G and manga artist group CLAMP. The film is a second part of the two-part film, following Blood-Club Dolls 1 in 2018. The film is directed and written by Shutaro Oku, with Junichi Fujisaku as a co-writer, distributed by NEGA and MOVIC, and stars Ryūnosuke Matsumura, Ryō Kitazano, Kanon Miyahara, Keisuke Minami, and Maon Kurosaki. The film was released in Japanese theaters on July 11, 2020.

Blood-Club Dolls 2 picks up where Blood-Club Dolls 1 left off, and is also set before the events of Blood-C: The Last Dark anime film (2012), as Saya Kisaragi is continuing her pursuit to find Fumito Nanahara; in the universe Blood-C, humanity are secretly preyed upon a race called the Elder Bairns, whose feeding is kept under control by an ancient agreement called Shrovetide. The film focuses on Sōen (who was introduced in Blood-C: The Last Mind stage play), and his underground fightclub called "Blood-Club".

The film marks the third live-action film adaptation for the Blood-C series, and a fourth for the Blood franchise since Blood: The Last Vampire (2009).

Plot
The next day after the "Blood-Club" incident, Aiba remembers that he was hypnotized by Sōen and his men to kill off innocent people. As he is sedated with Elder Bairn blood, Saya barges in the room where he is held captive, and urges him to fight off Fumitos influences. Meanwhile, Sōen kidnaps Michiru to have her answer of her actions, and Fumito and his assistant Yūka disguises as café owners to keep Mana and Mito from reaching her brother.

The other contestants are held in a remote location, and are sedated by the Elder Bairn blood for combat purposes. They battle Aiba, but he still bests them in a sword combats. As Michiru demands Sōen why they are in Tokyo, Fumito shoots back of her head. Sōen grieves, but shocked as Michiru is revealed to be an Elder Bairn. Mito learns of Aiba's whereabouts, but Saya kills him, as Fumito had slipped an Elder Bairn blood in his drink. Saya later battles Aiba, with Fumito watching both in the distance.

Cast

Ryūnosuke Matsumura as Sōen, the mafia-boss who's running an underground fight club called "Blood-Club" in Tokyo. The character was first introduced in The Last Mind stage play.
Ryō Kitazano as Aiba, a young man who went missing, later seen participating in "Blood-Club" underground event.
Kanon Miyahara as Saya Kisaragi, a humanoid Elder Bairn that wears a sailor-suited school uniform with a katana that is currently hunting down Fumito in Tokyo. The character was first introduced in the anime series.
Keisuke Minami as Fumito Nanahara, governor of Tokyo, and Saya's arch-nemesis. The character was first introduced in the anime series.
Asami Yoshikawa as Yūka Amino, a woman who works with Fumito in order to gain political power. The character was first introduced in the anime series.
Maon Kurosaki as Michiru Arisugawa, the daughter of the Arisugawa family.
Tomohito Yashima as Detective Mito, a detective who's investigating "Blood-Club", and searching for Aiba.
Aki Asakura as Mana, Aiba's little sister who is searching for her brother.

Other cast includes Takuya Kawahara as Melody, Judai Shirakashi as Kisanuki, Naoya Gomoto as Ginroku, Junji Shimizu as Higawa Mizunashi, Rie Sakurai as Yumi, Kō Hosokawa as Karajishi, Ren Yagami as Sogabe, Shōta Takasaki as Kōhan, Taishi Sugie as Reiji, Ryosei Tanaka as Kuroda, Yuya Asato as Sukegawa, Dai Hasegawa as Kada, and Yōji Tanaka as Kuzū. Takumi Kizu, Takeshi Maeda, Narushi Ikeda and Bernard Ackah also appear in an undisclosed roles.

Production

Development
In February 2018, it was announced that Blood-C was receiving another live-action film adaptation with a new story. In August 2018, the website announced that Blood-Club Dolls is a two-part film project. The staff members such as director and screenwriter Shutaro Oku, and co-screenwriter Junichi Fujisaku resumed their roles from Blood-Club Dolls 1, while Sennosuke Okumura now acted as a sole producer, with Akinaga Fujii in charge of the cinematography.

Casting
The majority of the actors from The Last Mind stage play, Asura Girl and Blood-Club Dolls 1 returned, with Ryūnosuke Matsumura, Kanon Miyahara, Keisuke Minami, and Asami Yoshikawa reprising their respective roles as Sōen, Saya, Fumito Nanahara and Yūka Amino, with Ryō Kitazono and singer Maon Kurosaki as Aiba and Michiru Arisugawa respectively. Takumi Kizu, Narushi Ikeda, and martial artist Bernard Ackah was also cast for this film.

Filming
The principal photography was done back in 2018 while filming Blood-Club Dolls 1, and was filmed in various areas of Tokyo, Japan.

Music
Kōsuke Nishimoto composed the music for Blood-Club Dolls 2. Ryō Kitazano provided the theme song for the film, titled "Over the little night".

Release
The film was released in Japanese theaters on July 11, 2020.

Notes

References

External links
  
 

2020 films
2020s action horror films
Japanese action horror films
2020s Japanese-language films
Live-action films based on animated series
Films about secret societies
Blood: The Last Vampire

ja:BLOOD-C#BLOOD-CLUB DOLLS2